Anderson Ranch Arts Center is a non-profit arts organization founded in 1966 and located in Snowmass Village, Colorado. They host an artist in residency program and the center offers workshops and classes by artists in the summer months of June, July and August. The campus is five acres in size and offers studio space for ceramic, painting, drawing, photography, sculpture and printmaking.

History 
The location was formerly a late 1800s working ranch. Anderson Ranch became an artists’ community in 1966 when it was founded by Paul Soldner. Other early artists involved were Daniel Rhodes, Jim Romberg, Toshiko Takahaezu, James Surls, and Charmaine Locke. The center became a nonprofit in 1973 and started offering an artist residency program in 1985. During the COVID-19 pandemic, Anderson Ranch started offering "Innovation Studios", a series of online workshops and classes.

References 

Artist colonies
Colorado culture
Artist residencies